The Danubian Limes, or Danube Limes, refers to the Roman military frontier or limes which lies along the River Danube in the present-day German state of Bavaria, in Austria, Slovakia, Hungary, Croatia, Serbia, Bulgaria and Romania.

The Danube was not always or everywhere used by the Romans as the military frontier which was moved north or south in some locations according to military conquests, but it was maintained in many places as a fairly permanent defensive structure for long periods. The border was reinforced with numerous watchtowers, legion camps (castra) and forts (castella). Due to the boggy and dendritic nature of the Danube's river banks no border ramparts were built, unlike the Neckar-Odenwald Limes in Germany. The camps were built in the mid-1st century. Later, under Trajan, the camps, which had originally only been surrounded by earthen embankments, were enclosed by stone walls.

A Roman road, the Danube Way was laid along the limes, which linked the stations, camps and forts as far as the Danube Delta.

In 2021, the western segment of the Danube Limes were inscribed on the UNESCO World Heritage List as part of the set of "Frontiers of the Roman Empire" World Heritage Sites.

Subdivisions 
Because of the sheer length of this border, the Danubian Limes is often divided into the following subdivisions:
 Rhaetian Limes, only those elements along the Danube being counted as part of the Danubian Limes.
 Noric Limes
 Pannonian Limes (in Upper and Lower Pannonia)
 Moesian Limes

Germany and Austria 

The oldest Roman camp in Austria was Carnuntum. Fourteen kilometres away to the west an auxiliary fort (Hilfskastell) was built near  Schlögen (today in the municipality of Haibach ob der Donau) in Upper Austria. At that time, the limes ran from Vienna to Linz roughly following the present-day Wiener Straße (B 1).

Because the Danube did not always provide adequate protection, bridgeheads were built on its northern banks against the Marcomanni, such as the one in Stillfried or at the Oberleiser Berg. However, these were cleared again under Marcus Aurelius' son, Commodus, and a seven-kilometre-wide 'death strip' was laid along the Danube.

The increasing number of fortifications that were falling into decay were renovated again under Emperor Valentinian I (364–375) and upgraded to the conform to the latest military tactics. Walls were thickened, and defensive ditches renewed. In addition, towers were built along the walls, such as a watchtower discovered near Oberranna in 1960. These fortifications lasted only another hundred years before the fall of the Roman Empire. In 488 the land of present-day Austria was cleared. The Roman fortifications along the lower courses of the Danube were overhauled once again, especially under Anastasios I and Justinian I. They finally served during Maurice's Balkan campaigns his successor, Phocas, as a basis for larger military operations and some were maintained in the province of Moesia Secunda until the invasion of the Bulgars in 679.

A few defensive towers survive: in Bacharnsdorf in Lower Austria, in Mautern (Favianis) and in Traismauer (Augustiana). In Tulln and Zeiselmauer, too, there are surviving remnants. In the Kürnberg Forest near Linz there are remains of a watchtower from the Roman period.

Legion camps were established in:
 Lauriacum (Enns)
 ? (Albing)
 Vindobona (Wien)
 Carnuntum

Camps (castra) and forts (castella) in Austria from west to east:
 Stanacum (Engelhartszell)
 Ioviacum (Schlögen)
 Ad Mauros (Eferding)
 Lentia (Linz)
 Ad Iuvense (Wallsee)
 Arelape (Pöchlarn)
 Namare (Melk an der Donau)
 Favianis (Mautern)
 Barbaricum (Fels am Wagram – nördlich der Donau)
 Augustianis (Traismauer)
 Asturis (Zwentendorf)
 Comagena (Tulln)
 Cannabiaca (Zeiselmauer)
 Arrianis/Asturis (Klosterneuburg)
 Ala Nova (Schwechat)
 ? (Mikulov-Tschechien)
 Aequinoctium (Fischamend)
 Roman fort, Höflein (Höflein)
 Roman fort, Stopfenreuth (Engelhartstetten)

Lower Pannonia 

In 103 AD, Emperor Trajan divided the province of Pannonia into two parts: Pannonia Superior and Pannonia Inferior, or Lower Pannonia. The Lower Pannonia province ran along the eastern side of the Danube, today a part of Hungary, Serbia, Croatia, and Bosnia and Herzegovina. 
Colonies and towns were built throughout the area on both sides of the Danube, in addition to Roman forts, garrisons, and bases. Some of the most notable were:

 Transaquincum, Contra Aquincum (Pest)
 Matrica (Százhalombatta)
 Gorsium (Tác)
 Vetus Salina (Adony)
 Intercisa (Dunaújváros)
 Lussonium (Dunakömlőd)
 Alisca ad latus (Őcsény)
 Ad Statuas (Várdomb)
 Lugio/Florentia (Dunaszekcső)
 Altinum (Kölked)
 Ad Militare (Batina)
 Ad Novas (Zmajevac)
 Colonia Aelia Mursa (Osijek)
 Teutoburgium (Dalj)
 Cuccium (Ilok)
 Cusum (Petrovaradin)
 Burgenae (Novi Banovci)
 Colonia Singidunum (Belgrade)

Lower Danube 

On the Lower Danube, between the present-day Bulgaria and Romania, the Lower Danubian Road was built under Emperor Tiberius in the 1st century AD on the Bulgarian side of the river.

Roman camps, smaller garrisons and watchtowers were built on both sides of the Danube. Civilian settlements, predominantly for veterans and former legionaries were also built. The following Roman garrisons were the first to be established during the 1st century on the Lower Danube:
 Augustae (near the village of Hurlets)
 Valeriana (near the village of Dolni Vadin)
 Variana (near the village of Leskowez)
 Almus (near the town of Lom)
 Regianum (near the town of Kozloduy)
 Sexaginta Prista (near the town of Ruse)
 Dorostorum (near the town of Silistra)
 Ratiaria (near the town of Artschar)
 Novae (near the town of Svishtov)
 Viminatium
 Singidunum (Belgrad)
 Oescus

References

Literature 
 Ralph F. Hoddinott: Bulgaria in Antiquity. An archeological introduction. Ernest Benn Ltd., London, 1975, pp. 111–142.
 Kurt Genser: Der Donaulimes in Österreich (= Schriften des Limesmuseums Aalen. Vol. 44). Württembergisches Landesmuseum, Stuttgart, 1990.
 Gerda von Bülow et al. (eds.): Der Limes an der unteren Donau von Diokletian bis Heraklios. Vorträge der Internationalen Konferenz Svištov, Bulgarien (1–5 September 1998). Verlag NOUS, Sofia, 1999, .
 Susanne Biegert (ed.): Von Augustus bis Attila. Leben am ungarischen Donaulimes (= Schriften des Limesmuseums Aalen. Vol. 53). Theiss, Stuttgart, 2000, .
 Herwig Friesinger et al. (eds.): Der römische Limes in Österreich. Führer zu den archäologischen Denkmälern. 2nd, revised edition. Verlag der Österreichischen Akademie der Wissenschaften, Vienna, 2002, .
 Sonja Jilek: Grenzen des Römischen Reiches: Der Donaulimes, eine römische Flussgrenze. Uniwersytet Warszawski, Warsaw, 2009, .

External links 
 Monuments Board of the Slovak Republic (publ.): Danube Limes in Slovakia. Ancient Roman Monuments on the Middle Danube. Printed Final Document to nominate the Slovakian Limes as a UNESCO World Heritage Site. Bratislava, 2011, retrieved 4 May 2013 (pdf; 5.8 MB).
 Zsolt Máté u. a.: Frontiers of the Roman Empire. Ripa Pannonica in Hungary (RPH). Nomination statement Vol. 1. National Office of Cultural Heritage, Budapest, 2011, retrieved 4 May 2013 (pdf; 3.1 MB).
 Zsolt Máté u. a.: Frontiers of the Roman Empire. Ripa Pannonica in Hungary (RPH). Nomination statement Vol. 2. Maps and plans, showing the boundaries of the nominated property and the buffer zone. National Office of Cultural Heritage, Budapest, 2011, retrieved 4 May 2013 (pdf; 119 MB).
 Zsolt Visy: The Danube Limes Project Archaeological Research Between 2008–2011. University of Pécs, Department of Archaeology, Pécs, 2011, retrieved 4 May 2013 (pdf; 24 MB).
 Beitrag im ORF
 Information pages on the Danubian Limes (German, English)

 World Heritage Sites in Germany
 World Heritage Sites in Austria
 World Heritage Sites in Slovakia

Roman fortifications in Germania Superior
Danube
Roman fortifications in Noricum
Roman fortifications in Dacia
Roman fortifications in Raetia
Roman fortifications in Pannonia Inferior
Roman fortifications in Pannonia Superior
Roman fortifications in Moesia Inferior
Roman fortifications in Austria
Roman fortifications in Bulgaria
Roman frontiers
Roman fortifications in Hungary
Roman fortifications in Romania
Roman fortifications in Serbia
Roman fortifications in Slovakia
Linear earthworks
Roman fortifications in Germany